Gun Nation is a 2016 documentary film directed and produced by British photographer and filmmaker Zed Nelson. The film explores issues surrounding gun ownership, gun violence, and gun culture in the United States and marks 18 years since the director's award-winning photography book of the same name. It was commissioned by The Guardian and by the Bertha Foundation, executive produced by Charlie Phillips and released online on 16 September 2016. The film was the first production to be screened in the documentary section of The Guardian.

References

External links
 Official website
 
 

2016 films
British documentary films
2016 documentary films
Gun politics
2010s British films